Gordon Park is a northern suburb in the City of Brisbane, Queensland, Australia.

Geography
It features several cafés. Gordon Park’s unique position within Brisbane’s inner northern belt provides immediate access to major infrastructure such as the Airport Link M7 and Northern Busway.

Over 37% of households in this area consist of couples with children, 40% are couples without children and 18% are single parent families.  Stand alone housing accounts for 65% of all dwellings in this area, and units account for a further 28%.  Highset Queenslanders, many beautifully renovated, are a feature of this green and leafy suburb. In June 2018 the median prices for a house and an apartment in Gordon Park were $889,100 (12% higher than last year) and $355,200 respectively.

Gordon Park shares an Australia Post postcode of 4031 with neighbouring suburb Kedron.

History
The Turrbal clan occupied the northern side of the Brisbane River. This clan was often referred to by the "whites" as the "Duke of York's" clan. There were camping grounds around the Breakfast Creek area and the explorers John Oxley and Allan Cunningham met members of the clan at the mouth of the Creek in 1824.

The main encampment of the Turrbal clan was in "Yorks Hollow". This gully passes through Victoria Park and the Royal National Association Showgrounds at Bowen Hills. In 1858 two Aborigines, Dalinkua and Dalpie from the Breakfast Creek area, wrote letters to The Moreton Bay Courier protesting about the treatment their people received at the hands of the white settlers.

The suburb was named after General Gordon who was the hero of the eight-month siege of Khartoum in the Sudan in the late 19th century. Most of the street names in the suburb relate to General Gordon, the armies he served with, and their sphere of operation (for example, Gordon Street, Khartoum Street, and Baker Street).

The Gordon Estate – Lutwyche of 264 blocks went to auction on 25 September 1886.

The Metropolitan Freehold Land and Building Company Limited advertised Gordon Park Estate for auction on 13 December 1890. It consisted of 1063 allotments (mostly of 16 to 20 perches). This estate was bounded by Stafford Road to the north, Gordon Street to the east, Kedron Brook to the south and Burnaby Street (now Burnaby Terrace) to the west, encompassing almost all of the present day suburb except for the south-western corner. However, the auctioneer G.T. Bell only sold 73 lots for an average price of £26 3s 7d (total £1,2917 10s).

On 27 March 1920, auctioneers Cameron Brothers offered 61 allotments in the south-west of the current suburb in the area of Granville Terrace (now Bedford Street), Aberdeen Terrace and Thistle Street (these did not form part of the 1890 subdivision). In June 1920, the auctioneers offered further blocks to the south of the March 1920 sales, in the area of Granville Terrace (now Bedford Street), Stirling Street and Montrose Street.

On 18 September 1920, auctioneers Isles, Love & Co offered 150 allotments in the Glenkedron South Estate Section 2 (in the north-east of the current suburb). The allotments were in First Avenue (now Suez Street), Second Avenue (now Swan Street), Third Avenue (now Goulburn Street), Fourth Avenue (now Jack Street), Fifth Avenue (now Barron Street) and Seventh Avenue (now Rose Lane).

On 6 May 1922, auctioneers Cameron Brothers offered 98 allotments for sale in the north-west of the current suburb in the area of Main Happy Valley Road (Stafford Road), Haig Street, Burnaby Street (now Burnaby Terrace), Turner Road (now Alva Terrace) and Victoria Terrace. These were part of the ninth second of the Gordon Park estate that had been first offered in 1890.

On 11 November 1922, auctioneers Cameron Brothers offered 47 allotments in Section 1A of the Glen Park estate (as first offered in 1890). These allotments were in the area of Cowper Street, Hill Street (now Highland Street), Beaconsfield Terrace, Richmond Street and Khartoum Street.

On 8 December 1923, auctioneers Cameron Brothers offered 45 home sites in the area of Granville Terrace (now Bedford Street), Aberdeen Terrace and Thistle Street.

On 10 May 1924, auctioneers Isles, Love & Co offered 24 remaining allotments in the Glenkedron South Estate in the north-east of the current suburb, which had been previously offered at auction in September 1920. All 24 allotments were sold.

In 1924, the Realty Development Company were selling suburban blocks (ranging from 16 to 20 perches) in the Tramway Extension Estate. This estate was bounded by Stafford Road to the north and Hill Street (now Highland Street) to the south and included Burnaby Street (now Burnaby Terrace), Turner Road (now Alva Terrace) and Victoria Terrace (and was part of the estate that was first offered in 1890 and again in 1922).

In 1926 the Gordon Park Baptist Church started as a tent mission on property at Khartoum Street which was owned by the church. It was originally known as the Gordon Park Mission Church. On Saturday 27 March 1926 a church building was officially opened on the corner of Khartoum and Hamilton Streets in the Grove Park Estate (approx ). The church rented a house, which became the home of the pastors on the corner of Groom and Thistle Streets until a manse was purchased and officially opened on 9 May 1953. The President of the Baptist Union of Queensland opened the church hall in 1961. A new church at 106 Khartoum Street was built which opened on 10 September 1977. The original pulpit from the old church along with a communion tray was donated to the Beenleigh Baptist Church.

On Sunday 28 July 1929 the archbishop James Duhig laid the foundation stone of a new Catholic church and school. He returned to bless and open the new church and school on Sunday 3 November 1929. The building was on two levels with the school on the lower level with a capacity of 200 students and the church on the upper level with a capacity of 250 people. The intention was that a new larger church would be built later and the school occupy both levels of the original building. St Carthage's Catholic Primary School opened on 8 July 1930; it was operated by the Sisters of Mercy. On 26 June 1966 the present brick church facing Beaconsfield Terrace was opened by Archbishop Patrick O’Donnell. The new buildings were designed by architects Corbett and Ryan and cost over $92,000, including furnishings. In November 1974, the Sisters of Mercy ceased to staff the school apart from one Sister for religious instruction. It was one of the first of the schools in the Brisbane Archdiocese to transition to lay control under headmaster Edward Benito Pender. However, the school was closed by the archdiocese in 1976 as it was felt that the enrolment of 86 students was insufficient to make the school financially viable.

On Saturday 19 October 1929, a site in Beaconsfield Terrace (near the junction with Cowper Street, approx ) was dedicated for a future Methodist church. On Saturday 20 September 1930 there was a stump capping ceremony as construction commenced on the church hall building. The hall was officially opened on Saturday 1 November 1930.

In November 1938, the Brisbane City Council announced that the tram to Gordon Park would be extended from Lutwyche Road via Bradshaw Street, crossing Kedron Brook into Thistle Street. Trams ran to Gordon Park connecting it with Brisbane until they were progressively withdrawn from use, finally ceasing all operations on 13 April 1969.

St John's Anglican Church on the corner of Khartoum Street and Cowper Street (approx ) was dedicated on 2 August 1959 by Archbishop Reginald Halse. Its closure on 15 March 1987 was approved by Assistant Bishop George Browning.

On 11 August 1975, Gordon Park ceased to be a separate suburb. However residents lobbied against this decision and, on 18 December 1992, Gordon Park was reinstated as a suburb.

The median age of the Gordon Park population was 35 years of age, 3 years below the Australian median. 73.9% of people living in Gordon Park were born in Australia, compared to the national average of 66.7%; the next most common countries of birth were New Zealand 2.9%, England 2.5%, India 2.1%, Italy 1.0%, and China 0.8%. 82.8% of people spoke only English at home; the next most popular languages were 1.7% Italian, 1.0% Spanish, 1.0% Mandarin, 0.9% Hindi, and 0.7% Punjabi.

Heritage listings 
Gordon Park has a number of heritage-listed sites, including:
 29 Aberdeen Terrace: former St Carthage's Catholic School building
 29 Jack Street: Alexander Barron's house

Education
There are no schools in Gordon Park. The nearest primary schools are in Stafford, Wooloowin and Kedron. The nearest secondary school is Kedron State High School.

Amenities 
St Carthage's Catholic Church is at 115 Beaconsfield Terrace.

Parks 
There are a number of parks, including:

 Amelia Park
 Archer Street Park

 Gordon Park Playground Park

 Hickey Park

 Kokoda Park

 Montrose Street Park

 Thistle Street Park (no.74)

 Wally Bourke Park

Notable residents
Gordon Park resident, Tom Nash, was born in Essex, England in 1909. He emigrated to Australia at the age of 17 aboard the S.S. Vedic, a ship chartered by the Salvation Army to bring 700 young emigrants to Australia. He was awarded the Order of Australia in 1985 in recognition of his service to the local community. Prior to receiving the award he had received a certificate of merit for services to the incapacitated Servicemen's Association, a RSL certificate of merit, honorary life membership of the RSL and the Paul Harris Fellowship medal from Rotary International. Tom Nash had also been a Brisbane City Council councillor.

References

External links

 
 
 

Suburbs of the City of Brisbane